The 2020 Meridian Canadian Open was held from January 14 to 19 at the Gallagher Centre in Yorkton, Saskatchewan. It was the fourth Grand Slam event and third "major" of the 2019–20 season. Due to the COVID-19 pandemic, it would end up being the last Grand Slam of the season, and the last Slam to be held until the 2021 Champions Cup held in April 2021. 

In the men's final, Team Jacobs won their third straight Grand Slam by beating Team Epping in a tight 6–5 game. In the women's final, Team Hasselborg also won her third straight event defeating young Team Kim 7–5 in an extra end.

Qualification

Sixteen teams compete in the Canadian Open, including the seven top-ranked teams on the World Curling Tour's Order of Merit rankings as of December 16, 2019, the seven top teams on the Year-to-Date rankings as of December 16, the Tier 2 winner of the 2019 Tour Challenge, and a sponsor's exemption. The first matches will be set per the rankings on December 24, 2019

Men
Top men's teams as of December 16:
{| class=wikitable
! # !! Order of Merit !!Year-to-Date
|-
!1
| 
 Brad Jacobs 
|
 Brad Jacobs
 John Epping
|-
!2
|
 John Epping
 Kevin Koe 
|
 Brad Gushue
|-
!3
|
 Brendan Bottcher
|
 Bruce Mouat
|-
!4
| 
 Niklas Edin
|
 Niklas Edin
 Brendan Bottcher
 Kevin Koe
 Yannick Schwaller
|-
!5
|
 Bruce Mouat
 Brad Gushue
 Peter de Cruz
|
 Mike McEwen
|-
!6
| 
 Mike McEwen
 Ross Paterson
|
 Peter de Cruz
 Ross Paterson
 Ross Whyte
 Matt Dunstone
|-
!7
| 
 Yannick Schwaller
 Matt Dunstone
 Glenn Howard
|
 Korey Dropkin
 Jason Gunnlaugson
|}

Sponsor's exemption:
 Kirk Muyres

Tour Challenge Tier 2 winner:
 Korey Dropkin

Women
Top women's teams as of December 16:
{| class=wikitable
! # !! Order of Merit !!Year-to-Date
|-
!1
| 
 Anna Hasselborg
|
 Tracy Fleury
|-
!2
|
 Tracy Fleury 
 Silvana Tirinzoni
|
 Anna Hasselborg
 Silvana Tirinzoni
 Satsuki Fujisawa
|-
!3
|
 Kerri Einarson
|
 Kerri Einarson
 Jennifer Jones
|-
!4
|
 Rachel Homan
|
 Rachel Homan
 Eve Muirhead
|-
!5
|
 Jennifer Jones
 Satsuki Fujisawa
 Chelsea Carey
|
 Elena Stern
|-
!6
|
 Eve Muirhead
 Elena Stern
 Sayaka Yoshimura
|
 Chelsea Carey
 Kelsey Rocque
|-
!7
|
 Kelsey Rocque
 Team Roth
|
 Sayaka Yoshimura
 Gim Un-chi
 Team Roth
 Alina Kovaleva
|}

Sponsor's exemption:
 Laura Walker

Tour Challenge Tier 2 winner:
 Kim Min-ji

Men

Teams

The teams are listed as follows:

Knockout brackets

A Event

B Event

C Event

Knockout results

All draw times are listed in Central Time (UTC−06:00).

Draw 1
Tuesday, January 14, 7:00 pm

Draw 2
Wednesday, January 15, 8:00 am

Draw 3
Wednesday, January 15, 12:00 pm

Draw 4
Wednesday, January 15, 4:00 pm

Draw 5
Wednesday, January 15, 8:00 pm

Draw 7
Thursday, January 16, 12:00 pm

Draw 9
Thursday, January 16, 8:00 pm

Draw 11
Friday, January 17, 12:00 pm

Draw 13
Friday, January 17, 8:00 pm

Playoffs

Quarterfinals
Saturday, January 18, 11:00 am

Semifinals
Saturday, January 18, 7:00 pm

Final
Sunday, January 19, 2:30 pm

Women

Teams

The teams are listed as follows:

Knockout brackets

A Event

B Event

C Event

Knockout results

All draw times are listed in Central Time (UTC−06:00).

Draw 2
Wednesday, January 15, 8:00 am

Draw 3
Wednesday, January 15, 12:00 pm

Draw 4
Wednesday, January 15, 4:00 pm

Draw 5
Wednesday, January 15, 8:00 pm

Draw 6
Thursday, January 16, 8:00 am

Draw 8
Thursday, January 16, 4:00 pm

Draw 10
Friday, January 17, 8:00 am

Draw 12
Friday, January 17, 4:00 pm

Draw 14
Saturday, January 18, 7:30 am

Playoffs

Quarterfinals
Saturday, January 18, 3:00 pm

Semifinals
Saturday, January 18, 7:00 pm

Final
Sunday, January 19, 11:00 am

Notes

References

External links

 

Canadian Open of Curling
Canadian Open
2020 in Canadian curling
Sport in Yorkton
Curling in Saskatchewan
2020 in Saskatchewan